Heather Joan Ross is professor of medicine at the University of Toronto in Ontario, Canada. Ross is a scientific lead for the Ted Rogers Centre for Heart Research, the director of the Ted Rogers Centre of Excellence in Heart Function and Director of the Cardiac Transplant Program at Toronto General Hospital. She has been the president of the Canadian Cardiovascular Society and the Canadian Society of Transplantation.

Education and early life 
Ross was born in Montreal, Quebec, Canada. At age 11, she did a 100 km bicycle trip and since has been a parachutist, a mountain biker, a rock-climber, a skier and a triathlete. She credits her grandfather and patients for motivating her to exercise and coined the slogan "your life is worth one hour a day". After attending Queen's University for an undergraduate degree in biology, she went to the University of British Columbia for her medical degree and Dalhousie University for her specialization in cardiology. She completed a postdoctoral fellowship in heart failure/heart transplantation at Stanford University. In addition, she studied bioethics, obtaining a master's degree at the University of Toronto.

Ross is a multi-instrumentalist, learning to play the saxophone, guitar and harmonica at a young age. She is currently the lead vocalist of an R&B band called "The Marginal Donors". The band includes two of University Health Network's transplant surgeons, Dr. Mark Cattral and Dr. Paul Greig.

Career 
Ross began her career in 1996 at Toronto General Hospital's Peter Munk Cardiac Centre. By 2018, she was involved in the care of over 500 patients undergoing heart transplantation. Ross specializes in issues related to end-of-life in patients with advanced heart failure, targeting gaps in end-of-life care. In 2006, Ross founded Test Your Limits, an organization that has raised over 2.5 million dollars for heart failure research and included expeditions to Antarctica (2006), Nepal (2008), North Pole (2010), South Pole (2013), Bhutan (2014), Nahanni (2015) and Tibet (2017). She is the recipient of the Order of Canada(2021), and the inaugural CCS Women in Cardiovascular Medicine/Science Mentorship Award.

Research interests 
Ross has authored over 340 peer-reviewed publications with an interest in end-of-life care, mobile health and outcomes in patients with advanced heart failure and heart transplantation.

References

Living people
Anglophone Quebec people
Canadian cardiologists
Women cardiologists
People from Montreal
Academic staff of the University of Toronto
Year of birth missing (living people)